Tony Rickardsson (born on 17 August 1970) is a Swedish former professional motorcycle speedway rider. He competed in the Speedway World Championships from 1989 to 2006. Rickardsson is notable for winning six Speedway World Championship titles in 15 attempts. He most recently rode for Masarna from Avesta in the Swedish Elitserien league, Unia Tarnów in the Polish Ekstraliga and for the Ipswich Witches, Poole Pirates, King's Lynn Stars, Arena-Essex Hammers and Oxford Cheetahs in the British Elite League. In 2011, Rickardsson was named an FIM Legend for his motorcycling achievements.

Career summary

Promising talent
Rickardsson was born in Avesta, Dalarna County, Sweden. In 1989 he became Swedish team champion with the now defunct Stockholm U team. The next year, he won the Swedish Championship, a title he's won six times since, including three times in a row from 1997 to 1999. That year, he also won a bronze medal at the Junior World Championships in Lviv. In 1991, he made his debut at the World Championship in Gothenburg, and surprised many by winning silver behind diminutive Dane Jan O. Pedersen. Rickardsson was lucky to actually make the 1991 World Final after having missed qualifying when he finished 10th in the Nordic Final in Denmark, but got his chance when as first reserve he replaced injured English rider Andy Smith for the World Semi-final in Germany and ended up finishing a strong 5th to qualify for the Final.

This promising performance was followed up by two fourteenth-places at the next World Championship, before he won the last single-event World Championships in an extra play-off race against Danish triple World Champion Hans Nielsen and Australian Craig Boyce. In 1993 he won the Speedway World Pairs Championship with Per Jonsson and Henrik Gustafsson. He also won the 1992 and 1994 World Team Cup Championships as a member of the powerful Swedish teams which included 1990 World Champion Per Jonsson, Henrik Gustafsson, 1988 World Under-21 champ Peter Nahlin, Jimmy Nilsen and Mikael Karlsson.

World dominance
Despite being on or near the top of the tables in the new Speedway Grand Prix series, organised as six events where points were tallied at the end, Rickardsson failed to win a single individual Grand Prix event in the next three years, and only won a World Championship silver and a Swedish Championship in that time. However, from 1998 onwards, he was dominant. He won three of six events in 1998, including a home win in Linköping, and ended up beating fellow Swede Jimmy Nilsen by 12 points. Joining Hans Nielsen as the only 2 riders to have won world titles in both the single meeting and grand prix formats. This year, he also won the Elitserien with Valsarna of Hagfors, being the highest averaging rider that season, and he won the British Elite League with Ipswich, averaging the highest for them as well. 1999 was an almost equally stunning season, although it started badly when he got disqualified in the first race at Prague, finishing eleventh. After three races, he was third, 24 points behind Tomasz Gollob, who looked to be cruising to victory. However, Gollob ran into trouble in the fourth race at Coventry, being forced to retire after the introductory stages and finishing eighth, meaning that Rickardsson caught up 15 points in one race. With one event left at Vojens, Gollob still led by four points, but in a quarter-final heat where Ryan Sullivan had been excluded and he only had to finish in the top two to qualify for the semi-final, Gollob finished third, and the pressure was off Rickardsson - who would now win if he finished in the top six. This recovery gave him Swedish sport's arguably greatest award, Svenska Dagbladet Gold Medal (lit.: The Achievement Medal), for the best achievement of the year.

21st century
Rickardsson continued to win titles throughout the new century, although Mark Loram won the 2000 World Championship despite not winning a single event. Rickardsson won one - at Wrocław, but was too inconsistent to win the overall title. However, he again won the Elitserien, this time with his local team Masarna from Avesta, as he and team-mate Leigh Adams were the two highest averaging riders in the entire league. In 2001 he was back on the World stage, winning the World title with a record 121 points from six Grand Prix events, only missing one final - the last, at home on Stockholms Stadion, which was really academic as only a thirteenth place could possibly have robbed him of the title. He managed to win at home in the next Grand Prix series in 2002, which gave him three individual wins as he won his fifth World Championship. In 2003, he finished third overall. Thirteenth place finishes in Gothenburg, Bydgoszcz and Vikingskipet at Hamar ruining his bid for the title, and a concussion kept him out of the Swedish team that won the World Cup at Vojens (though he was part of a qualifier race and hence stands with a World Cup medal - his only title that year). The following year he managed to win the Swedish Championship at Målilla, but consistency eluded him as Jason Crump pipped him to the World title by three points (although the lead was 17 points before the final race). He followed this up with another extremely strong season in 2005. With 6 First positions at Wrocław (1st Event), Krško (3rd), Millennium Stadium (4th), Idrætsparken (5th) in Copenhagen, Prage (6th) and Lonigo (9th); a second in the Swedish event at Eskilstuna (2nd); third in the Scandinavian held in Målilla (7th) and a lowly 9th in the Polish Grand Prix held at Bydgoszcz (8th Event). Even with such a poor finish in Poland, however, he had already virtually sown up the Championship in the 7th Grand Prix in Målilla, ahead of Jason Crump. After the sixth event held in the Czech Republic, he was first in the points per event table of the Elitserien (the Swedish Domestic Elite League). Though Tony stated that he would give up racing after the 2006 season, he announced his early retirement from both World Championship and Domestic Speedway on 1 August 2006 at a press conference in Stockholm, in order to pursue his interest in racing cars instead. Rickardsson was a contestant on the TV4 television show Let's Dance 2008 in which he finished 2nd.

Summary of Titles
 Speedway World Champion 6 times (1994, 1998, 1999, 2001, 2002, 2005) - Record, jointly held with Ivan Mauger of New Zealand
 World Pairs Champion 1993
 World Team Cup winner 2 times (1994, 2000)
 World Cup winner 2 times (2003, 2004)
 Swedish Champion 7 times (1990, 1994, 1997, 1998, 1999, 2001, 2004)
 Swedish Elite League Champion 3 times (1989 with Stockholm, 1998 with Valsarna, 2000 with Masarna)
 Swedish National League Champion (1987 with Gamarna)
 Polish League Champion 3 times (2001 with Torun, 2004, 2005 with Tarnow)
 Peter Craven Shield (British team competition) Champion 2 times (1998 with Ipswich, 2001 with Poole)
 British Elite League Champion 3 Times (1998 with Ipswich, 2003 & 2004 with Poole)
 Series 500 Champion (Australian Masters Series) 1 time (1995)
 Golden Helmet of Pardubice 3 times (1992, 1993, 1995)

World Final Appearances

Individual World Championship
 1991 -  Gothenburg, Ullevi - 2nd - 12pts
 1992 -  Wrocław, Olympic Stadium - 14th - 5pts
 1993 -  Pocking, Rottalstadion - 14th - 4pts
 1994 -  Vojens, Speedway Center Winner - 12pts + 3pts

World Pairs Championship
 1992 -  Lonigo Pista Speedway (with Per Jonsson / Henrik Gustafsson) - 2nd - 22pts (0)
 1993 -  Vojens, Speedway Center (with Per Jonsson / Henrik Gustafsson) - Winner - 26pts (15)

World Team Cup
 1991 -  Vojens, Speedway Center (with Per Jonsson / Henrik Gustafsson / Jimmy Nilsen / Peter Nahlin) - 2nd - 30pts (7)
 1992 -  Kumla, Kumla motorstadion (with Per Jonsson / Henrik Gustafsson / Jimmy Nilsen / Peter Nahlin) - second - 33pts (7)
 1993 -  Coventry, Brandon Stadium (with Per Jonsson / Henrik Gustafsson / Peter Karlsson / Peter Nahlin) - 3rd - 28pts (9)
 1994 -  Brokstedt, Holsteinring Brokstedt (with Henrik Gustafsson / Mikael Karlsson) - Winner - 23pts (12)
 1995 -  Bydgoszcz, Polonia Bydgoszcz Stadium (with Henrik Gustafsson / Peter Karlsson) - 4th - 19pts (15+2)
 1997 -  Piła, Stadion żużlowy MOSiR (with Jimmy Nilsen / Peter Karlsson) - 3rd - 21pts (17)
 1998 -  Vojens, Speedway Center (with Jimmy Nilsen / Peter Karlsson) - 2nd - 24pts (5)
 2000 -  Coventry, Brandon Stadium (with Mikael Karlsson / Henrik Gustafsson / Peter Karlsson / Niklas Klingberg) - Winner - 40pts (16+3)

World Cup
 2001 -  Wrocław, Olympic Stadium (with Jimmy Nilsen / Mikael Karlsson / Niklas Klingberg / Andreas Jonsson) - 3rd - 51pts (17)
 2002 -  Peterborough, East of England Showground (with Niklas Klingberg / Peter Karlsson / Mikael Karlsson / Stefan Andersson) - 3rd - 54pts (15)
 2004 -  Poole, Poole Stadium (with Mikael Karlsson / Antonio Lindbäck / Andreas Jonsson / Peter Karlsson) - Winner - 49pts (12)
 2005 -  Wrocław, Olympic Stadium (with Peter Karlsson / Andreas Jonsson / Antonio Lindbäck / Fredrik Lindgren) - 2nd - 34pts (7)

Individual Under-21 World Championship
 1990 -  Lviv, Stadium Ska - 3rd - 10pts

Speedway Grand Prix results

Trivia
 He was nominated for the most prestigious Swedish sports awards for many years before finally winning in 2006. For the last four years the Swedish comedian Robert Gustafsson often appeared as him, talking sarcastically about how the winners deserved the prize while he was annoyed about never winning.

References

External links
https://web.archive.org/web/20010625231359/http://www.rickardssonracing.com/
Speedway Home Page

http://www.speedwayhistory.com
Speedway Info

1970 births
Living people
Swedish speedway riders
Individual Speedway World Champions
Speedway World Cup champions
Speedway World Pairs Champions
Polonia Bydgoszcz riders
Ipswich Witches riders
Oxford Cheetahs riders
People from Avesta Municipality
Poole Pirates riders
King's Lynn Stars riders
Lakeside Hammers riders
Expatriate speedway riders in Poland
Swedish expatriates in Poland
Masarna riders
Sportspeople from Dalarna County